The Setters Formation is a geological formation in Maryland, Pennsylvania, and Delaware.  The formation is metamorphic and consists of a complex suite of schist, gneiss, and quartzite.

References

Geology of Maryland